Blendworth is a village in the East Hampshire district of Hampshire, England. It lies 0.4 miles (0.6 km) northeast of Horndean just east off the A3 road.

The village has a population of fewer than 100 people.  The church, Holy Trinity, was erected in 1850–51, and until recently had a C of E Infant School next to it. It is part of the parish of Horndean.
Blendworth also has a brass band. and had stables until 2022 when all the land belonging to Myrtle Farm - which included the stables - was sold.
The nearest railway station is 2.2 miles (3.5 km) southeast of the village, at Rowlands Castle.

The village is also close to Chalton, Finchdean and Rowlands Castle.

Blendworth Brass Band
The Blendworth Brass Band was founded in 1982 by Commander Chris Eason, OBE. The band are well known in the surrounding areas such as: Portsmouth, Southampton, Hayling Island, Denmead, Petersfield, Liss, Havant and Waterlooville. They regularly take trips within the UK and Europe to promote brass band music and further their musical ability.

The band rehearse at the Blendworth Church Centre on Thursday evenings from 7.30pm to 9.30pm.

References

External links

Holy Trinity Blendworth
Blendworth Brass Band
Blendworth Church Hall

Villages in Hampshire